Mississippi Highway 463 (MS 463) is a north–south state highway in Madison County, Mississippi, connecting U.S. Route 51 (US 51) in Madison to MS 22 east of Flora.  It intersects Interstate 55 (I-55) at the state's only single-point urban interchange.

Route description
MS 463 starts at the intersection of US 51 and Hoy Road in Madison, and travels westward from the center of the town. The road, known as Madison Parkway, crosses over a railroad and intersects Main Street. The route then travels northwestwards on Main Street and meets I-55 at a single-point urban interchange. Past Highland Colony Parkway and Bozeman Road, the road becomes New Mannsdale Road, and later Mannsdale Road at its intersection with Henderson Road. MS 463 begins to turn north at North Livingston Road, and then it travels through a large residential area. The road leaves the city limits of Madison north of Annadale Road and turns northwest near Stribling Road. The route ends at a T-intersection with MS 22 near Flora.

Major intersections

References

External links

463
Transportation in Madison County, Mississippi